This is a list of defunct airlines of the Republic of Ireland.

See also

 List of airlines of the Republic of Ireland
 List of airports in Republic of Ireland

References

Ireland, Republic Of
Airlines,Defunct
Airlines,Defunct